Lluís Martínez i Sistach (born 29 April 1937) is a Spanish prelate of the Catholic Church. He is Archbishop emeritus of Barcelona, having served as archbishop there from 2004 to 2015. He has been a cardinal since 2007.

Sistach was born on 29 April 1937 in Barcelona, Catalonia, Spain, the son of Joan Martínez i Puig, a commercial representative, and Maria Sistach i Masllorens, a housewife. He had two sisters. The family resided in the neighborhood of Guinardó. He studied at Marist Brothers'  in Barcelona from 1942 to 1953 and at the Major Seminary of Barcelona from 1954 to 1961. He was ordained a priest on 17 September 1961. He studied at the Pontifical Lateran University in Rome from 1962 to 1967 where he earned a doctorate utriusque iuris (in both canon and civil law) in 1967. His dissertation, "El Derecho de asociación en la Iglesia" (The right of association in the Church), was published by the Theological Faculty of Catalonia.

In 1987 Sistach was appointed Auxiliary Bishop of Barcelona with the titular see of Algeciras. He was appointed Bishop of Tortosa in 1991. In 1997 he became Archbishop of Tarragona and in 2004 he became Archbishop of Barcelona.

Pope Benedict XVI made him a cardinal in the consistory held on 24 November 2007. He became Cardinal-Priest of San Sebastiano alle Catacombe.

He opposed legislation introduced in the Catalan parliament in December 2007 requiring local governments to set aside land for mosques and other places of worship. He said that "A church, a synagogue or a mosque are not the same thing" and that the law "impinges on our ability to exercise a fundamental right, that of religious liberty."

Sistach is also a member of various offices of the Roman Curia. In May 2008 Pope Benedict named Sistach to the Pontifical Council for Legislative Texts. On 12 June 2008, Pope Benedict named him a member of the Apostolic Signatura and a member of the Pontifical Council for the Laity.

Sistach received Pope Benedict XVI when Pope Benedict visited Barcelona and Santiago de Compostela in 2010.

On 18 September 2012, Pope Benedict XVI named Sistach a Synod Father for the October 2012 13th Ordinary General Assembly of the Synod of Bishops on the New Evangelization.

He was one of the cardinal electors who participated in the 2013 papal conclave that elected Pope Francis.

When some prelates criticized the document that summarized the deliberations of the October 2014 Synod of Bishops, Sistach defended the document, saying "It is far from being complete, but it is an unbiased summary." He added: "We must all convert ourselves, and conversion is a painful experience."

Pope Francis accepted his retirement on 6 November 2015.

References

External links

 
Biography, Archdiocese of Barcelona website

1937 births
Living people
People from Barcelona
Archbishops of Tarragona
21st-century Spanish cardinals
Bishops of Barcelona
20th-century Roman Catholic archbishops in Spain
21st-century Roman Catholic archbishops in Spain
Pontifical Lateran University alumni
Members of the Apostolic Signatura
Cardinals created by Pope Benedict XVI
Members of the Order of the Holy Sepulchre